If I Were Just Anyone (Spanish: Si fuera una cualquiera) is a 1950 Mexican drama film directed by Ernesto Cortázar and starring Meche Barba and Fernando Fernández. The film is the sequel to the film Love Street.

Plot
Fernando (Fernando Fernández) and Queta (Meche Barba) manage the prosperous tortería Acá las tortas. The relationship between Fernando and Queta breaks down when he is related with two evil women, owners of a cabaret. Both women were protected by a corrupt cop who wants Queta, and convinces her to dance in the cabaret. When Fernando discovers her, he thinks that she has become into a whore. Fernando finished singing in ordinary cabarets, while Queta looking for a way to convince him of her innocence.

Cast
 Meche Barba
 Fernando Fernández
 Lilia Prado
 Freddy Fernández "El Pichi"
 Alma Delia Fuentes
 Roberto Cobo
 Francisco Avitia
 Los Panchos

Reviews
The film is a sequel to the same year film Love Street , also starring by Barba and Fernández.

References

External links
 
 Abandomoviez: Si fuera una cualquiera

1950 films
Mexican black-and-white films
Rumberas films
1950s Spanish-language films
Films scored by Manuel Esperón
Mexican drama films
1950 drama films
1950s Mexican films